The Lviv-Volyn coal basin is a coal basin within the Lviv Oblast and Volyn Oblast of Ukraine. In the western direction in continues into Poland, . Its area is about 10,000 km2.

References

Coal mining regions in Ukraine
Economy of Lviv Oblast
Geography of Lviv Oblast
Economy of Volyn Oblast
Geography of Volyn Oblast

uk:Льві́всько-Воли́нський вугі́льний басе́йн